The 2016 Ohio Republican presidential primary took place March 15 in the U.S. state of Ohio, as a part of the Republican Party's series of presidential primaries ahead of the 2016 presidential election. The Ohio primary was held alongside Republican primary elections in Florida, Illinois, Missouri and North Carolina, along with the Democratic contest in Ohio.

The primary was won by the state's then governor, John Kasich.

Background
In the 2012 Republican primary elections, the Ohio primary was a winner-take-most primary scheduled for the 6th of March. However, the state's winner, Mitt Romney, reached only 37% of the vote and thus won only 58% of the state's delegates. House Bill 153, signed by Governor Kasich, moved the primary to March 15 for the 2016 contest, in what would be dubbed a second Super Tuesday by several news networks. In addition, in mid-September, Ohio's Republican Party decided to make the state's 66 delegates completely winner-take-all, in order to maximize the state's power on the nominating convention and to avoid a similar problem to what happened in 2012. This was also expected to help John Kasich, as the state's governor.

The state of the campaign

Previous contests
Despite an early victory by Ted Cruz in the Iowa caucuses, Donald Trump was seen as making steady progress towards the Republican nomination at the time. Trump was victorious in 7 of the contests on March 1, with Cruz seen as the only viable threat to Trump after victories in his home state of Texas and 3 other March 1 contests. Marco Rubio performed worse than anticipated on March 1, taking only Minnesota. On March 8, two primaries and a caucus were held in Hawaii, Michigan and Mississippi. Despite a poll from American Research Group that showed Kasich leading Trump in Michigan, Trump won all three contests.

Run-up to the election

The opinion polls during early March showed a narrow lead for Trump over Governor Kasich. These polls found approximately 10% support for Marco Rubio, in a distant fourth place. Seeing that many Rubio voters also preferred Governor Kasich as "establishment" voters, Rubio's communications director encouraged Rubio voters to vote for Kasich on March 11. The strategy seemed to work, as Kasich drew narrowly ahead in the polls immediately before the election. Kasich was seen as a slight favorite to take the state immediately before the primary.

Results

Marco Rubio suspended his campaign after March 15's contests, although this was more based on a poor Florida primary as opposed to the Ohio contest.

References

Ohio
2016 Ohio elections
March 2016 events in the United States
Ohio Republican primaries